A caboose is a crewed railroad car at the end of a freight train in North America.

Caboose may also refer to:
 
 Caboose (ship's galley), a ship's kitchen above deck
 Caboose (Red vs. Blue), a character in the video series Red vs. Blue
 Caboose (film), a 1996 Canadian film directed by Richard Roy
 "Caboose", a song by Sugar Ray from Lemonade and Brownies
 Mrs. Crabbople's Caboose a children's television series, with set design, and puppetry by Wayne White (artist), shortly before working on Pee-wee's Playhouse.

See also 
 Buttocks, in slang, due to a caboose being the "rear end" of a train
 Bustle, slang, A bustle is a padded undergarment used to add fullness, or support the drapery, at the back of women's dresses in the mid-to-late 19th century.